Dr. Praveen Chandra is an Indian cardiologist and chairman of interventional cardiology at Medanta - The Medicity, Gurgaon, India. He is recognised as one of the leaders in angioplasty in the country and is proficient in a lot of new devices and technologies. He has been awarded for his contribution and services in the field of coronary angioplasty in India in 1998.

He has also served as director of Cardiac Cath Lab & Acute MI Services at Max Healthcare and consultant cardiologist at Escorts Heart Institute and Research Center, New Delhi.

He is a fellow of the Endovascular Intervention Society of India and the Asia-Pacific Society of Interventional Cardiology. Dr. Chandra has been a distinguished faculty member in various international meetings and was the organiser and director of the AMI course held in New Delhi for 2005 and 2006. He has published approximately 100 articles, reviews and abstracts in various national and international scientific journals. He is an alumnus of King George Medical College (KGMC), Lucknow. He was born in 1963 in Gorakhpur to Dr. U.C. Verma and completed his intermediate from Colvins Taluqadar College, Lucknow. 

The Government of India awarded him the civilian honour of the Padma Shri in 2016.

As a writer, he has contributed to a number of publications including NDTV.

References

External links

Indian cardiologists
Living people
Recipients of the Padma Shri in medicine
20th-century Indian medical doctors
Medical doctors from Haryana
People from Gurgaon
1963 births